Abergavenny Town Football Club is a Welsh association football club based in the town of Abergavenny, Monmouthshire, The team play in the Cymru South, tier 2 of the Welsh football pyramid. They play at Pen-Y-Pound Stadium in Abergavenny. 

The club was founded in June 2014 after local side Govilon changed their name, eleven months after the former club Abergavenny Thursdays folded, citing a lack of players as the reason.

History 
The new club was entered into the 5th Tier of the Welsh football pyramid, the Gwent County League First Division for the 2014–15 season. They finished the season as champions of the division after going the entire league campaign unbeaten. This earned the club a place in Tier 4 of the Welsh Football League.

Success continued during the 2015–16 season as the club won promotion to the 3rd Tier, after finishing second in the league. The club also won the FAW trophy following a 1–0 victory over Sully Sports.

The 2016–17 saw Abergavenny finish 11th in the 3rd Tier of the Welsh football pyramid and the end of the season saw long time servant and Manager Steve “Butch” Morgan leave the club after 20 years of involvement at Govillon and Abergavenny.

Season 2017–18 saw the club promote reserve team player/manager Ben Bannon to first team manager. Bannon led the team to a 10th-place finish in the league.

The club narrowly missed out on the promotion positions in 2018–19, finishing 5th, just 2 points below 3rd place Caerau (Ely) A.F.C. They remained in Tier 3 for the third year running.

Abergavenny's 2019–20 season in Tier 3 (the 2019-20 Welsh Football League Division One) was cut short by the COVID-19 pandemic. After the Football Association of Wales decided on a points per game basis to conclude the season, Abergavenny finished 13th. In June 2020 they were awarded a Tier 3 license by the FAW, as part of the FAW restructuring of the Welsh Leagues and joined the new Ardal Leagues structure in the South East Division.  After the 2020–21 season was cancelled due to Covid restrictions, the club went on to become the inaugural league champions in the 2021–22 season and gained promotion to the Cymru South for the 2022–23 season.

Pen-Y-Pound Stadium 
Football has been played at Pen-Y-Pound since around the 1930s. Stadium development, including building a 250-seat stand and club house, was achieved by Thursday's first management committee led by local businessman Vince Sullivan. Unfortunately the stand hasn't been used since the League of Wales days in the early 1990s but the club are trying to get the stand reopened and used in the future.

In 1963 Pen-Y-Pound was used as a helicopter landing site for John Lennon. The Beatles were playing in the Town and Lennon had been in London making an appearance on the BBC television show Juke Box Jury. He landed in Abergavenny's Penypound football ground at 9.50pm, and was driven straight to the Town Hall.

The ground has hosted a couple of Welsh Youth international matches during the years.

Honours
Gwent County League Division 1 Champions – 2014–15
Welsh Football League Division 3 Runners Up - 2015-16
Ardal SE – Champions: 2021–22
FAW Trophy Winners - 2015-15

References

External links
Official Club Twitter

Football clubs in Wales
Association football clubs established in 2014
Sport in Monmouthshire
Abergavenny
2014 establishments in Wales
Welsh Football League clubs
Ardal Leagues clubs
Cymru South clubs